Adam Hogg (born 26 April 1934) was a Scottish footballer who played for Airdrie, Swindon and Dumbarton.

References

External links

1934 births
Living people
Scottish footballers
Airdrieonians F.C. (1878) players
Swindon Town F.C. players
Dumbarton F.C. players
Scottish Football League players
Footballers from Airdrie, North Lanarkshire
English Football League players
Association football central defenders